Ioan Lloyd (born 5 April 2001) is a Welsh rugby union player who plays for Bristol Bears. His usual position is fly-half. He made his first appearance against Bath in the first game of the 2019-2020 season and scored two tries in his first two performances.

Career
Lloyd won the 2015 Dewar Shield with Cardiff Schools before joining Cardiff Blues. He then moved to England, joining Clifton College and was quickly snapped up by Bristol. He has played international rugby, representing Wales U18 at the 2019 Six Nations Festival.

Lloyd represented Wales U20 in the 2020 Six Nations U20 Championship, starting two matches at fullback.

Lloyd was named man of the match on his competitive debut at fly half, scoring 22 points in a 59–21 win against Zebre Parma in the 2019–20 European Rugby Challenge Cup.

On 6 October 2020 he was named in the senior Wales squad for the 2020 Autumn Nations Cup. He made his debut for Wales on the 18 November 2020 as a second half replacement the 18-0 win against Georgia. Prior to his international debut, Lloyd had only made four starts for Bristol. Lloyd warmed his second cap the next week, coming off the bench against Italy.

Lloyd was selected in the Welsh squad for the 2021 July rugby union tests, but did not feature in any of the match day squads.

In 2021, Lloyd was named as the Discovery of the Season after a breakout year for Bristol, moving from a bench player to a starter for the first team.

Known for his versatility, Lloyd has started matches at fly half, centre, wing, and fullback, and has covered scrum half during an injury crisis. Ahead of the 2022–23 Premiership Rugby season, Bristol coach Pat Lam indicated that Lloyd’s long term focus would be at inside centre.

Personal life 
Lloyd’s younger brother Jac is also a fly half, and has followed in his footsteps: both having played for Wales U20. Jac has also played for Clifton College, and is part of the Bristol Bears academy, like Ioan before him.

External links
Bristol profile
WRU profile

References

Living people
2001 births
Welsh rugby union players
Wales international rugby union players
Rugby union players from Cardiff
Rugby union fly-halves
Bristol Bears players